Social-Code is the second album by the Canadian alternative rock group Social Code under that name. It was released on May 8, 2007, exactly 3 years after the first album, in only Canada so far.
"Bomb Hands" was the official first single. The music video received significant play on MuchMusic. The next singles were "The Shortest Line", "Everyday (Late November)" and "He Said, She Said".

Track listing

Singles
"Bomb Hands"
"The Shortest Line"
"Everyday (Late November)"
"He Said, She Said"

Release history

Personnel
Travis Nesbitt - lead vocals
Morgan Gies - lead & rhythm guitars
Logan Jacobs - bass
Ben Shillabeer - drums, percussion

2007 albums
Social Code albums